Harley Quinn Smith (born June 26, 1999) is an American actress and musician. Smith has appeared in the film Tusk and starred in its spin-off Yoga Hosers, both written and directed by her father, filmmaker Kevin Smith. She is also the bass player and one of the singers in the punk rock band The Tenth. She also appeared in Jay and Silent Bob Reboot.

Early life
Harley Quinn Smith was born in Red Bank, New Jersey, the daughter of Kevin Smith and actress and journalist Jennifer Schwalbach Smith. She was named after the Batman character.

Career 
Smith made her acting debut in her father's film Jay and Silent Bob Strike Back, by portraying the recurring character Silent Bob as a toddler. In 2004, she had an uncredited cameo as Tracy Colelli in the drama film Jersey Girl and two years later in the comedy film Clerks II. In 2014, she had a small role in the thriller film Tusk, a role she reprised in a starring capacity in 2016's Yoga Hosers. In January 2016, it was announced that Smith will play her father's character's daughter in the half-hour comedy Hollyweed.

In 2017, Smith was cast as Lindsay in All These Small Moments, which premiered at the 2018 Tribeca Film Festival.

Smith joined John Barrowman and other co-hosts in the debut September 15, 2018 episode of DC Daily, a discussion show focusing on DC Universe comic topics

In early 2019, Smith rejoined her father's View Askewniverse, playing Millennium "Milly" Faulken in Jay and Silent Bob Reboot. According to Kevin Smith, Milly is part of a girl-gang (made up of characters played by Aparna Brielle, Treshelle Edmond, and Alice Wen) that is not unlike the girl-gang of Jay and Silent Bob Strike Back; however, their goals and motivations are different, and they were put together as a commentary on Hollywood's use of youth and diversity in reboots and sequels. Kevin Smith says that Milly's role in the gang is similar to Shannon Elizabeth's character Justice, her character being the daughter of Jay and Justice. The movie was released later in the fall. She also had a small role in Quentin Tarantino Once Upon a Time in Hollywood, portraying a member of the Manson Family.

Personal life
Smith is good friends with and a frequent co-star of Lily-Rose Depp, daughter of actor Johnny Depp and Vanessa Paradis, and actress Aparna Brielle. 

Smith is bisexual. Smith is also a vegan, and hosts a podcast with her father about veganism.

Filmography

Film

Television

References

External links
 

1999 births
Living people
American child actresses
21st-century American actresses
People from Red Bank, New Jersey
Actresses from New Jersey
American film actresses
American television actresses
Bisexual actresses
Kevin Smith
LGBT people from New Jersey
American bisexual actors
American women podcasters
American podcasters